James Walter Courtes Lavers was Archdeacon of the Seychelles from 1925 to 1931.

Lavers was educated at King's College London and Lincoln Theological College; and ordained in 1905. After curacies in Greenwich, South Scarle  and Brampton he was Chaplain at Mahé before his time as Archdeacon and the incumbent at Denton, Norfolk afterwards.

References

20th-century English Anglican priests
Alumni of King's College London
Alumni of Lincoln Theological College
Archdeacons of the Seychelles